USS Providence (SSN-719), a , is the fifth vessel of the United States Navy to be named for Providence, Rhode Island. The contract to build her was awarded to the Electric Boat Division of General Dynamics Corporation in Groton, Connecticut on 16 April 1979 and her keel was laid down on 14 October 1982. She was launched on 4 August 1984 sponsored by Mrs. William F. Smith, and commissioned on 27 July 1985.

Providence is the first Los Angeles class submarine to be equipped with the Tomahawk missile Vertical Launch System (VLS). While others used test boxes and programs, Providence was the first submarine to launch a Tomahawk cruise missile from the VLS system using its combat system CCS MK1 and associated software Program C4.1.

History
Providence has been deployed several times to the Western Atlantic Ocean, the Mediterranean Sea, and the Persian Gulf. Some of the ports visited have included Port Canaveral (Cocoa Beach, Florida) and Port Everglades (Fort Lauderdale, Florida), Naval Station Roosevelt Roads, Puerto Rico, Tromsø, Norway, Halifax, Canada, Gibraltar, Toulon, France, Souda Bay, Crete, La Maddalena, Italy, and Koper, Slovenia, in the Mediterranean, and al-Manama, Bahrain, and both Dubai and Jebel Ali, United Arab Emirates in the Persian Gulf. The submarine has made transits of the Suez Canal in 1998, 2001, and 2003 and participated in Operation Southern Watch, Operation Enduring Freedom and Operation Iraqi Freedom, where she earned the nickname "Big dog of the Red Sea wolf pack."

She has since been retrofitted with numerous upgrades including the AN/BYG-1 Fire Control system and AN/BQQ-10 ARCI Sonar suite. Her achievements continued in 2006–2007 as she has also completed an around-the-world deployment to the Western Pacific Ocean earning the coveted Order of Magellan certificate, participating in Exercise MALABAR 2006, and many other significant assignments. Port visits included Singapore, Yokosuka and Okinawa in Japan, Goa in India, as well as transits through both the Suez Canal and Panama Canal. 

In 2008, she completed another deployment to the Western Pacific Ocean, only this time taking a northern route, successfully transiting under the arctic ice cap.

On March 19, 2011, Providence launched Tomahawk cruise missiles at Libyan air defenses as part of Operation Odyssey Dawn.

She was then assigned to Submarine Squadron 12 at US Naval Submarine Base New London, Groton, Connecticut.

Inactivation and decommissioning
On 20 August 2021, a Change of Homeport ceremony was held at the Naval Submarine Base New London, in Groton, Connecticut. Providence was then transferred to Kitsap Naval Base in Bremerton , Washington for decommissioning after 37 years of service. Providence was officially placed in reserve status, inactivated but in commission on 2 December 2021. The submarine was officially decommissioned on 15 August 2022 (although she was decommissioned on 22 August 2022 in the Naval Vessel Register) and the decommissioning ceremony for Providence was held on 1 September 2022.

Awards and decorations
four Navy Unit Commendations
six Meritorious Unit Commendations
six Battle E (Navy "E" Ribbon) awards (three of which were consecutive)
four Navy Expeditionary Medals
two National Defense Service Medals
three Armed Forces Expeditionary Medals
Global War on Terrorism Expeditionary Medal
Global War on Terrorism Service Medal
Sea Service Deployment Ribbon

Providence won the Tomahawk Strike Derby in 1988 with a 5-second time on target. The USS Providence was the winner of the 2008 Arleigh Burke Award for superior performance in battle efficiency, presented by Fleet Forces Command on Monday 16 June 2008. Providence has, once again, earned the coveted 2008–2009 Battle Efficiency 'E' for COMSUBRON 2.

In popular culture

References

Los Angeles-class submarines
Cold War submarines of the United States
Nuclear submarines of the United States Navy
Ships built in Groton, Connecticut
1984 ships
Submarines of the United States